Strongylocentrotus fragilis is a species of sea urchin of the family Strongylocentrotidae.

Description and characteristics 
This is a regular sea urchin, with a spherical test bearing the anus and top and mouth on the bottom. They are somewhat flattened, and of pale pinkish color with white spines. It is a deep-sea species, and they can occur in great number where food is abundant.

Habitat and range 
This is an abyssal species, occurring at many hundred meters deep on the western coasts of the North America. They are distributed throughout the continental shelf and slope, being most abundant in the 200-300m depth range.

Taxonomy 
It was first scientifically described in 1912 by Jackson.

This species is often referred as Allocentrotus fragilis, and its taxonomy is still under debate.

References 

Strongylocentrotidae
Animals described in 1912